The 2019–20 Hong Kong FA Cup was the 45th edition of the Hong Kong FA Cup. 10 teams entered this edition, with 2 games played in the First Round before the quarter-final stage. The competition was only open to clubs who participated in the 2019–20 Hong Kong Premier League, with lower division sides entering the Junior Division, a separate competition.  

The champion received HK$100,000 in prize money and the runners up received HK$40,000. The MVP of the final received a HK$10,000 bonus.

Kitchee were the defending champions, but were eliminated in the quarter-finals. Eastern became the champions for the fifth time after beating R&F in the final.

Calendar

Bracket

Bold = winner
* = after extra time, = penalty shootout score

Fixtures and results

First round

Quarter-finals

Semi-finals

Final

Notes

Top scorers

References

2019-20
FA Cup
Hong Kong
Hong Kong FA Cup, 2019-20